Hamid Sadid (born 24 May 1989) is a mixed martial artist and a professional Afghan footballer who plays as a midfielder.

International career
Sadid made his debut for Afghanistan against Kyrgyzstan. He was not selected for the AFC Challenge Cup 2014.

References

1989 births
Living people
Afghan footballers
Afghanistan international footballers
Association football midfielders